Durga Mukherjee (14 October 1933 – 2 February 2011) was an Indian cricketer. He played first-class cricket for Bengal and Railways.

See also
 List of Bengal cricketers

References

External links
 

1933 births
2011 deaths
Indian cricketers
Bengal cricketers
Railways cricketers
Cricketers from Kolkata